The 2008 Bahraini Crown Prince Cup was the 8th edition of the cup tournament in men's football (soccer). This edition featured the top four sides from the Bahraini Premier League 2007-08 season.

Bracket

Bahraini Crown Prince Cup seasons
2008 domestic association football cups
2007–08 in Bahraini football

References